KDPX is an FM radio station at 101.3 MHz in Pine Bluff, Arkansas. The station is owned by Bluff City Radio, a company of Mike Huckabee and Paul Coats, and operated by PB Radio under a local marketing agreement; it broadcasts an oldies format known as Oldies 101.3.

History
The station received its first callsign in March 2015 as KHUC and changed its calls to KPBA on March 16, launching as urban contemporary station "101-3 The Beat". Huckabee and Coats had bought the permits for three stations from Nancy Miller and acquired KTRN from another owner.

In March 2018, Huckabee and Coats struck a local marketing agreement to have the four Pine Bluff stations he owned be operated by PB Radio, which is owned by Mike and Alpha Horne. PB Radio also has the option of purchasing them.

On July 21, 2018, as part of a format shuffle at PB Radio, the urban contemporary format and KPBA calls moved to 99.3, and 101.3 became an oldies station under the KDPX callsign.

References

External links

DPX
Oldies radio stations in the United States